Pebbles, Volume 12 is a compilation album among the LPs in the Pebbles series. The music on this album has no relation to Pebbles, Volume 12 that was released on CD many years later.

Release data

This album was released by AIP Records (as #AIP-10002), in 1983 and was kept in print for many years, with reissues as late as 1995.

Notes on the tracks

The Vejtables, from San Francisco are among the better known bands that are featured in the Pebbles series; their lead singer, Jan Errico would later move to the Mojo Men.  These Outcasts are not the same band that was featured on Pebbles, Volume 1.

Track listing

Side 1:

 The Nomads: "From Zero Down" (Deatherage/Evans), 2:31
 The Teddy Boys: "Mona" (Elias B. McDaniel), 2:52
 The Coming Times: "Keep the Music Playing" (Rosenberg), 2:25
 The Breakers: "Don't Send Me No Flowers (I Ain't Dead Yet)" (Weiss), 2:08 – Rel. 1965
 Peter & the Rabbits: "Someone I've Got My Eyes Upon" (Gayden), 1:57
 Pawnee Drive: "Ride" (Roberts), 2:31 – Rel. 1969
 The Mad Hatters: "I'll Come Running" (Stuart/Berns), 2:22

Side 2:

 The Vejtables: "Feel the Music" (Bailey/Fortunato), 2:50
 Clockwork Orange: "Your Golden Touch" (Terry Frazier), 2:12
 Clockwork Orange: "Do Me Right Now" (Doug Kershaw), 1:30
 Richard and the Young Lions: "You Can Make It" (Brown/Bloodworth/Nader), 2:38
 The Outcasts: "I Didn't Have to Love Her Anymore" (Foley), 3:11
 The Jam: "Something's Gone" (Terry Smith), 2:53
 The Free Thinkers: "You Were Born for Me" (Wes Farrell/Doc Pomus), 2:27

Pebbles (series) albums
1983 compilation albums